The 1920 New Year Honours in New Zealand were appointments by King George V on the advice of the New Zealand government to various orders and honours to reward and highlight good works by New Zealanders. The awards celebrated the passing of 1919 and the beginning of 1920, and were announced on 1 January 1920.

The recipients of honours are displayed here as they were styled before their new honour.

Order of Saint Michael and Saint George

Knight Commander (KCMG)
 The Honourable William Herbert Herries – minister of railways and native affairs.

Companion (CMG)
 The Honourable Māui Pōmare – member of the Executive Council.
 Frank David Thomson – private secretary to the prime minister. For services in connection with the Peace Conference.

Order of the British Empire

Knight Commander (KBE)
Civil division
 The Honourable Robert Heaton Rhodes. For services as New Zealand Red Cross commissioner in England, and in connection with the welfare of the troops of the Dominion.

References

New Year Honours
1920 awards
1920 in New Zealand
New Zealand awards